William Henry Rand (May 2, 1828 – June 20, 1915) was an American printer and co-founder of the Rand McNally publishing company.  He was born in Quincy, Massachusetts, and as a young man was an apprentice at his brothers' print shop in Boston. He was enticed west in September 1849, by the California Gold Rush. He settled in Los Angeles and co-founded the city's first newspaper, the Los Angeles Star. In 1856, he returned to Boston for a short time before moving to Chicago and opening a print shop in June of that year. Two years later he hired an Irish immigrant, Andrew McNally, to work in his shop for $9 per week. The two formally established Rand, McNally & Co. in 1868 and became one of the biggest and best-known map publishers in history. Rand retired as president of Rand McNally in 1899 and returned to his boyhood home of East Milton. He died in New Canaan, Connecticut at his daughter's home after being ill for some time. He had three daughters, one of whom was Agnes Lee, and two sons, one of whom was William Rand, Jr.

Sources 

 Short, John Rennie (2001). Representing the Republic: Mapping the United States, 1600-1900. London: Reaktion Books. 
 New York Times, June 22, 1915. W.H. RAND, PUBLISHER, DIES; Former Head of Rand, McNally & Co. Was a Pioneer Printer. 
Rand McNally & Company: Information and Much More from Answers.com
http://www.ancestry.com

1828 births
1915 deaths
American publishers (people)
Businesspeople from California
Businesspeople from Chicago
People from Milton, Massachusetts
People from Quincy, Massachusetts
19th-century American businesspeople